The 1968 Idaho Vandals football team represented the University of Idaho in the 1968 NCAA College Division football season. The Vandals were led by first-year head coach Y C McNease and played in the Big Sky Conference. Home games were played on campus at Neale Stadium in Moscow, with one home game in Boise at old Bronco Stadium at Boise Junior College.

This was the last season for Neale Stadium, which opened 31 years earlier in 1937. It hosted only two games in 1968, and the final one was a win over Weber State on November 2. Due to soil erosion, the wooden grandstands were deemed unsafe the following summer and home games were moved to Rogers Field in Pullman for two seasons.

After fullback Ray McDonald won the NCAA rushing title in 1966, the Vandals were involuntarily dropped by the NCAA to the college division  After two seasons, Idaho returned to the university division in 1969.

For the second straight season, Idaho allowed 77 points at the Astrodome in Houston.

Schedule

Roster

All-conference
Wide receiver Jerry Hendren and linebacker Joe Tasby were unanimous selections to the all-conference team, and were joined by running back Rob Young.

NFL Draft
Two juniors from the 1968 Vandals were selected in the 1970 NFL Draft, which lasted seventeen rounds (442 selections).

List of Idaho Vandals in the NFL Draft

References

External links
Gem of the Mountains: 1969 University of Idaho yearbook – 1968 football season
Go Mighty Vandals – 1968 football season
Idaho Argonaut – student newspaper – 1968 editions
Game program: Idaho vs. Washington State at Spokane – September 21, 1968

Idaho
Idaho Vandals football seasons
Big Sky Conference football champion seasons
Idaho Vandals football